A.R.O.G: A Prehistoric Film is a 2008 Turkish science-fiction comedy film, directed by Cem Yılmaz and Ali Taner Baltacı, about a used carpet salesman who is sent back in time by an old interplanetary adversary out for revenge. It is a sequel to G.O.R.A. (2004) and was followed by the sequel Arif V 216 (2018).

Plot 
Arif settles back on earth with Ceku after saving the planet GORA. However, his defeated archenemy Commander Logar has followed him and is intent on getting his revenge. He tricks Arif into a time machine and sends him back 1 million years into the past. After a series of adventures including an encounter with a T-Rex, Arif  stumbles upon a settlement of cavemen. Arif tries to teach them about modern technology, but it appears that they are being oppressed by a rival tribe and their leader Kaaya. Kaaya tricks Arif into a do-or-die football-like game that is heavily stacked against them. However, Arif uses his wits to defeat Kaaya's team and  win the game for his fledgling team. Commander Logar who warps  into the past is left stranded there and eaten by a T-Rex while Arif and Ceku live happily ever after.

Main cast
 Cem Yılmaz - Arif/Kaaya/Logar
 Özge Özberk - Ceku
 Özkan Uğur - Dimi
 Nil Karaibrahimgil - Mimi
 Zafer Algöz - Karga/Doctor
 Ozan Güven - Taşo
 Hasan Kaçan - Cuhara

References

External links
 
 

2008 films
2000s Turkish-language films
2000s science fiction comedy films
2000s parody films
Films set in Turkey
Turkish science fiction comedy films
Turkish films about revenge
Films about cavemen
Turkish sequel films
2000s pregnancy films
Turkish pregnancy films